KSJQ is a radio station airing a country music format licensed to Savannah, Missouri, broadcasting on 92.7 MHz FM.  The station serves the areas of St. Joseph, Missouri and Maryville, Missouri, and is owned by Eagle Communications, Inc.

History
The station signed on in late 1991. It has always carried a country music format. Original license holder Sara Blann transferred control of the station to current owner Eagle Communications in 1993.

The station shares studios in St. Joseph with its sister stations KKJO, KFEQ, KESJ, and KYSJ.

References

External links

Country radio stations in the United States
SJQ